Joseph Stancliffe Davis (November 5, 1885 – April 23, 1975) was an American economist. He was a professor of economics at Stanford University and a long-time director of the newly established Food Research Institute. In 1944, he served as president of the American Economic Association. He was a member of President Eisenhower's Council of Economic Advisers.

He was born in Chester County, Pennsylvania, and graduated from Harvard University 1908 and was awarded the Doctorate of Philosophy in 1913.

References 

1885 births
1975 deaths
People from Chester County, Pennsylvania
Harvard University alumni
Presidents of the American Economic Association
Economists from Pennsylvania
20th-century American economists
United States Council of Economic Advisers